Dušan Čelar (born 20 February 1996) is a Serbian footballer who plays as a forward.

References

External links
 

1999 births
Living people
Footballers from Belgrade
Serbian footballers
Association football forwards
FK Zemun players
CFR Cluj players
FC Dinamo București players
Serbian First League players
Liga I players
Liga III players